Joeri Calleeuw (born 5 August 1985 in Bruges) is a Belgian cyclist, who last rode for amateur team Wielerteam Decock–Van Eyck–Devos–Capoen.

Major results

2008
 1st  Overall Tour du Sénégal
1st  Young rider classification
1st Stages 5 & 6
 4th Ronde van Midden-Nederland
 9th Flèche Ardennaise
2009
 1st Overall Ronde van Antwerpen
1st Stage 1
 7th Nationale Sluitingsprijs
2010
 6th Omloop Het Nieuwsblad Beloften
 7th Flèche Ardennaise
 9th Kattekoers
 10th Grand Prix de la ville de Pérenchies
2011
 5th Kattekoers
 5th Flèche Ardennaise
 5th Omloop Het Nieuwsblad Beloften
2012
 1st Stage 4 Tour of Madagascar
 7th Flèche Ardennaise
 8th Omloop Het Nieuwsblad Beloften
 10th Overall Tour du Faso
2014
 1st Ghent–Staden
 1st Beselare–Zonnebeke
 1st Grand Prix de la ville de Geluwe
 Ronde van Namen
1st Stages 3 & 5
2015
 1st  Overall Paris–Arras Tour
1st Stage 1 (TTT)
 2nd Kattekoers
 2nd Grand Prix de la ville de Pérenchies
 4th Overall Ronde van Midden-Nederland
1st Stage 1 (TTT)
 6th Overall Circuit des Ardennes
 7th Circuit de Wallonie
2016
 7th Tour de l'Eurométropole
2017
 9th Overall Paris–Arras Tour
2018
 1st Stage 6 (TTT) Tour du Faso

References

External links

1985 births
Living people
Belgian male cyclists
Sportspeople from Bruges
Cyclists from West Flanders
21st-century Belgian people